The Liaison Office of the Republic of South Africa represents the interests of South Africa in Taiwan in the absence of formal diplomatic relations, functioning as a de facto embassy. It also provides visa services. Its counterpart of Taiwan is the Taipei Liaison Office in the Republic of South Africa in Pretoria. 

The Office is headed by a Representative, currently Robert Seraki Matsebe.

History
The Office was formerly the Embassy of the Republic of South Africa. South Africa first established a Consulate in Taipei in 1967, which was upgraded to a Consulate General three years later. In 1976, this was upgraded to an Embassy.

However, when South Africa recognised the People's Republic of China, its diplomatic relations with Taiwan were terminated. This led to the establishment of the Office in 1998.

See also
 South Africa–Taiwan relations
 List of diplomatic missions of South Africa

References

External links

 
 
 

1998 establishments in Taiwan
South Africa
Taiwan
Organizations established in 1998
South Africa–Taiwan relations